Lynval Golding (born 24 July 1951) is a Jamaican-born British musician. His family moved from Jamaica to Gloucester, before moving to Coventry when he was eighteen. He is currently living in Gig Harbor, Washington. He is best known as a rhythm guitarist and vocalist with the British 2 Tone Records band, the Specials.

He went on to co-found the Fun Boy Three with Terry Hall and Neville Staple. Recently he was touring with The Beat, a reunion version of another second wave ska band. He started a band in Seattle, Stiff Upper Lips, that was fairly short lived, but which in 2013 re-formed as Gigantor.

In 2007, he appeared live at the Glastonbury Festival on the Pyramid Stage with Lily Allen and fellow Specials / Fun Boy Three band member Terry Hall. He also played on the Park Stage, once again with Terry Hall and also Blur frontman Damon Albarn and beatboxer Shlomo, playing a version of The Specials hit "A Message To You, Rudy". On 28 July 2007, Golding appeared with his current band, Pama International, at the Dunstaffnage music festival near Oban, Scotland.

Golding regularly tours the UK with Pama International, who have recorded three albums with his input on guitar. This band is signed to www.rockersrevolt.com, an independent record label.

He continues to tour with The Specials when not performing with Gigantor.

Discography
See also The Specials Discography, Fun Boy Three, Pama International

References 

1951 births
English people of Jamaican descent
Jamaican emigrants to the United Kingdom
People from Saint Catherine Parish
English male singers
English rock guitarists
Black British rock musicians
The Specials members
Fun Boy Three members
The Beat (British band) members
Living people
People from Gig Harbor, Washington
English male guitarists
English punk rock guitarists
British ska musicians